The fourth and final season of Knight Rider, an American television series that ran from Sept 26, 1982 to Apr 4, 1986, began September 20, 1985, and ended on April 4, 1986. It aired on NBC. The region 1 DVD was released on April 4, 2006.

Interest in the show declined, leading to its cancellation by the end of the season. Hasselhoff, knowing that the show was coming to an end, attempted to make a "series finale" and helped conceive the story "The Scent of Roses" with his wife at the time, Catherine Hickland, who played Michael's love interest Stephanie Mason in past episodes. The network instead aired "Voodoo Knight" as the final episode.  

A new street-smart mechanic, played by Peter Parros, was added to the cast in addition to Bonnie. Of all KITT's features added in fourth season, the most important of them is "Super Pursuit Mode". KITT could also convert into an open convertible. Both cars were designed and built by customizer George Barris.

This season also marks the final appearance of Bonnie Barstow, RC3, and the Knight Industries Two Thousand in its original form. KITT's final appearance in the Knight Rider franchise was in the 1991 made-for-TV movie Knight Rider 2000.

Cast
 David Hasselhoff as Michael Knight
 William Daniels as the voice of KITT (Knight Industries Two Thousand) (uncredited)
 Edward Mulhare as Devon Miles
 Patricia McPherson as Dr. Bonnie Barstow
 Peter Parros as Reginald Cornelius III aka RC3
 Richard Basehart as the voice of Wilton Knight

Episodes

References

External links 
 
 

 
1985 American television seasons
1986 American television seasons
Knight Rider (1982 TV series) seasons